David Coxhill (born 10 April 1952) is an English former professional footballer. He played for Millwall and Gillingham between 1970 and 1975.

References

1952 births
Living people
English footballers
Gillingham F.C. players
Millwall F.C. players
Association football midfielders
People from Brentford